Ștefan Stoica (born 23 June 1967) is a Romanian professional football coach and a former player.

Stoica played abroad for AEL and Veria F.C. in the Greek Super League.

References

External links
 

1967 births
Living people
People from Dolj County
Romanian footballers
Romania international footballers
Association football midfielders
Association football forwards
Liga I players
CS Universitatea Craiova players
FC U Craiova 1948 players
FC Steaua București players
Super League Greece players
Athlitiki Enosi Larissa F.C. players
Veria F.C. players
Romanian expatriate footballers
Romanian expatriate sportspeople in Greece
Expatriate footballers in Greece
Romanian football managers
FC Steaua București assistant managers
FC U Craiova 1948 managers
FC Gloria Buzău managers
FCV Farul Constanța managers
FC Milsami Orhei managers
Veria F.C. managers
FC Zimbru Chișinău managers
CSM Ceahlăul Piatra Neamț managers
Moldova national football team managers
Moldovan Super Liga managers
Romanian expatriate football managers
Expatriate football managers in Cyprus
Expatriate football managers in Moldova
Expatriate football managers in Greece
Romanian expatriate sportspeople in Cyprus
Romanian expatriate sportspeople in Moldova